The 1951 Troy State Red Wave football team represented Troy State Teachers College (now known as Troy University) as a member of the Alabama Intercollegiate Conference (AIC) during the 1951 college football season. Led by first-year head coach Jim Grantham, the Red Wave compiled an overall record of 2–7, with a mark of 0–3 in conference play.

Schedule

References

Troy State
Troy Trojans football seasons
Troy State Red Wave football